Type 813 spy ship is the first purpose-built, indigenously designed spy ship entering service with the People's Liberation Army Navy (PLAN).

Type 813 is the result of the urgent need of specialized spy ship for intelligence gathering missions in the mid-1970s, and to speed up the program, it was decided in October 1976 that the newly constructed spy ship would share the same hull of Type 645 oceanographic research ship. Design begun in August 1977 by the 2nd Directorate of the 708th Institute of China State Shipbuilding Corporation, which is also more commonly known as China Shipbuilding and Oceanic Engineering Design Academy (中国船舶及海洋工程设计研究)  nowadays. Design work was completed in September 1980 and construction immediately begun in the same month. There are a total of ten sets of reconnaissance equipment on board and the ship entered service with South Sea Fleet. The ship is designed to withstand storm with wind scale of 12. Originally named as Xiangyanghong (向阳红) 21, the ship was later renamed as Neptune. After the ship has been transferred to Chinese Coast Guard and received pennant number 3469, it was replaced by a Type 815A spy ship with the same name Neptune.

References

Auxiliary surveillance ship classes
Auxiliary ships of the People's Liberation Army Navy